David Timothy Dunn (born May 25, 1984) is an American musician. A singer-songwriter, he appeared on season two of NBC's The Voice. Dunn is a contemporary Christian artist. He is signed to BEC Recordings.

Early life
David Timothy Dunn was born on May 25, 1984 in Midland, Texas to father Tim Dunn and mother Terri Lee Dunn (née, Spannaus) where he was raised, and he went on to study engineering at Texas Tech University. He graduated with honors. While in college, he got his start as an acoustic singer-songwriter. He recorded his first album during his senior year before leaving to go to Africa for a year-long humanitarian trip.

Dunn appeared on the second season of NBC's The Voice. He lives in Nashville, Tennessee.

Personal life
Dunn married his girlfriend Leen on July 12, 2017. In December 2017, it was revealed they were expecting their first child together.  Their son, Rhodes Antrim Dunn, was born on May 19, 2018.

Discography

Singles

Music videos

References

External links
 

1984 births
Performers of contemporary Christian music
American performers of Christian music
Christian music songwriters
BEC Recordings artists
Texas Tech University alumni
Living people
People from Midland, Texas